Baik Jong-sub (born July 5, 1980) is an amateur boxer in the Lightweight division from South Korea.

Olympic results
Participated in the 2004 Olympic Games as a Lightweight boxer
Defeated Gyula Kate (Hungary) 30-23
Defeated Uranchimegiin Mönkh-Erdene (Mongolia) 33-22
Lost to Amir Khan (Great Britain) RSC-1 (1:37)

Baik qualified for the Athens Games by winning the gold medal at the 2004 Asian Amateur Boxing Championships in Puerto Princesa, Philippines. In the final he defeated Pakistan's Asghar Ali Shah.

At the 2005 World Championships he beat three opponents including Selcuk Aydin but ran into eventual winner Yordenis Ugás in the quarterfinals and lost.

External links
 2005 results

1980 births
Living people
Lightweight boxers
Boxers at the 2004 Summer Olympics
Boxers at the 2008 Summer Olympics
Olympic boxers of South Korea
Asian Games medalists in boxing
Boxers at the 2002 Asian Games
Boxers at the 2006 Asian Games
South Korean male boxers
Asian Games silver medalists for South Korea
Medalists at the 2002 Asian Games